Eremophila foliosissima, commonly known as poverty bush, is a flowering plant in the figwort family, Scrophulariaceae and is endemic to Western Australia. It is a small, erect, densely foliaged shrub with long, narrow, hairy leaves and mauve to purple flowers. It is similar to Eremophila gilesii but is more dense and rounded, has more crowded leaves and has different hairs on the flowers.

Description
Older leaves usually hang down the stem, forming a thick mat over its surface.

The outside of the petal tube and the lobes on its end are light purple to lilac-coloured and the inside of the tube is white. The outside of the petal tube and the lobes are covered with glandular hairs, the inside of the lobes are glabrous and the inside of the tube is filled with long, soft hairs. The 4 stamens are fully enclosed in the petal tube.

Taxonomy and naming
Eremophila foliosissima was first formally described in 1925 by Friedrich Wilhelm Ludwig Kraenzlin and the description was published in Bulletin of Miscellaneous Information. The specific epithet (foliosissima) is a Latin word meaning "leafiest".

Distribution and habitat
This eremophila is widespread in and between the Shire of Murchison and Warburton in the Central Ranges, Gascoyne, Great Victoria Desert and Murchison biogeographic regions. It grows in sand, clay or loam, often in mulga woodland.

Conservation status
Eremophila foliosissima is classified as "not threatened" by the Western Australian Government Department of Parks and Wildlife.

Use in horticulture
Poverty bush has long, narrow greyish and slightly hairy leaves and large blue to purple flowers making it an attractive and contrasting garden plant. It is difficult to propagate from seed, cuttings or by grafting onto Myoporum species but the last of this methods is the most reliable and is best done from late summer to early autumn. The grafted forms will grow in any soil and all will grow in full sun or partial shade and will tolerate long droughts. It is damaged by severe frosts and in humid areas like Sydney needs to be grown in an area with air movement.

References

foliosissima
Eudicots of Western Australia
Plants described in 2007
Endemic flora of Western Australia
Taxa named by Friedrich Wilhelm Ludwig Kraenzlin